North Horsham is a proposed railway station in Horsham, West Sussex which would serve the North Horsham Business Park. The proposal was backed by West Sussex County Council who favoured this over Kilnwood Vale.

References

Proposed railway stations in England